Enos Bromage (22 October 1898 – 7 April 1978) was an English professional association footballer of the 1920s. Born in Mickleover, he joined Gillingham from Derby County in 1927 and went on to make 21 appearances for the club in The Football League, scoring six goals. He left to join West Bromwich Albion in 1928.

References

1898 births
1978 deaths
Footballers from Derby
Association football forwards
English footballers
Doncaster Rovers F.C. players
Sheffield United F.C. players
Derby County F.C. players
Gillingham F.C. players
West Bromwich Albion F.C. players
Nottingham Forest F.C. players
Chester City F.C. players
Telford United F.C. players
English Football League players
People from Mickleover